"Please Don't Leave Me" is a song by English hard rock musician John Sykes. It was released in 1982 by MCA Records as his first solo single. It also features members of the Irish hard rock group Thin Lizzy, including frontman Phil Lynott, who co-wrote the track with Sykes.

After leaving his previous band Tygers of Pan Tang, Sykes was still contractually obligated to deliver a single to MCA Records. Having already written the instrumental for what was to become "Please Don't Leave Me", Sykes wanted to approach Thin Lizzy frontman Phil Lynott about a potential collaboration. Producer Chris Tsangarides, who had  worked with both Tygers of Pan Tang and Thin Lizzy, acted as an intermediary. After listening to a demo, Lynott agreed to participate, bringing drummer Brian Downey and keyboardist Darren Wharton with him. The song was recorded at Lombard Studios in Dublin with Tsangarides producing. After the track was finished, Lynott asked Sykes to join Thin Lizzy, which he accepted.

In 1992, "Please Don't Leave Me" was repackaged with material Sykes had recorded with Tygers of Pan Tang and released as a compilation album in Japan. That same year, Danish hard rock group Pretty Maids covered the song on their album Sin-Decade. Sykes would later re-record "Please Don't Leave Me" for his 1997 album Loveland, on which it was retitled "Don't Hurt Me This Way (Please Don't Leave Me '97)".

Track listing
All songs written and composed by John Sykes and Phil Lynott, except where noted.

7" vinyl (1982)

CD (1992, Japan)

Personnel
Credits are adapted from the liner notes.

Musicians
 John Sykes – guitar
 Phil Lynott – vocals, bass
 Brian Downey – drums
 Darren Wharton – keyboards

Production
 Chris Tsangarides – production, engineering
 John Swannell – photography

References

External links

1982 songs
1982 singles
MCA Records singles
1992 albums
John Sykes albums
MCA Records albums
Songs written by Phil Lynott